Li Tianmin (October 14, 1909 – June 24, 1993), or Li Tien-Min (romanised), was a Chinese Nationalist politician and political historian.

Born in Sichuan province, Li studied at the Central Military Academy in Wuhan and completed his undergraduate studies in economics at Waseda University.  He was elected as the Kuomintang candidate in 1948 to represent the municipality of Chengdu in Sichuan province in the Legislative Yuan of the Republic of China. He held this seat from 1948 until 1991, even after fleeing to Taiwan with the Nationalist government in 1949 at the end of the Chinese Civil War.

A historical biographer, and a professor at the National Chengchi University, he wrote six books on Chinese Communist party leaders Zhou Enlai, Mao Zedong, Liu Shaoqi, Deng Xiaoping, and Lin Biao.

Li had seven children.  His second son and youngest child, Kai-Fu Lee, is a prominent computer scientist and businessman who is the founding president of Google China and previously the founder of Microsoft Research Asia.

Books 
 Chou En-Lai. Institute of International Relations, 1970.
 Liu Shao-ch'i: Mao's first heir-apparent.  Institute of International Relations, 1975.
 Ping Zhou Enlai.  Ming bao chu ban she, 1994.  Published posthumously; translated into English as A review of Zhou Enlai.

References

1909 births
1993 deaths
20th-century biographers
Chinese biographers
Chinese Civil War refugees
Educators from Sichuan
Kuomintang Members of the Legislative Yuan in Taiwan
Historians from Sichuan
Members of the 1st Legislative Yuan
Members of the 1st Legislative Yuan in Taiwan
Academic staff of the National Chengchi University
Republic of China historians
Republic of China politicians from Sichuan
Taiwanese people from Sichuan
Whampoa Military Academy alumni
Writers from Chengdu